Three Days of Fear is a 1952 West German comedy crime film directed by Erich Waschneck and starring Rudolf Platte, Camilla Spira and Cornelia Froboess. It was shot at the Göttingen Studios. The film's sets were designed by Hans Jürgen Kiebach and Gabriel Pellon.

Synopsis
A tailor who strong resembles a jewel thief on the run, exchanges place with him for three days.

Cast

References

Bibliography 
 Hans-Michael Bock and Tim Bergfelder. The Concise Cinegraph: An Encyclopedia of German Cinema. Berghahn Books, 2009.

External links 
 

1952 films
1950s crime comedy films
German comedy films
West German films
1950s German-language films
Films directed by Erich Waschneck
1952 comedy films
German black-and-white films
1950s German films
Films shot at Göttingen Studios